Gordan Kičić (born 5 August 1977) is a Serbian actor, comedian and director. 

Acclaimed for both his comedic and dramatic roles, he is prominent for his starring role in the acclaimed television series Balkan Shadows, and for his roles in praised Serbian films War Live (2000), Sky Hook (2000), Mala noćna muzika (2002), Kad porastem biću Kengur (2004), Seven and a Half (2006) and Redemption Street (2012).

He is also known for his supporting role as foolish Rajko in the popular television comedy Otvorena vrata. In November 2019, he made his directorial debut with the successful film Realna priča.

He is a permanent member of the Atelje 212 theatre. In 2010, he won the Zoran Radmilović Award for his performance in the cult theatre's production of Hair.

Career

Theatre
Kičić graduated from the Faculty of Dramatic Arts in Belgrade. Prior graduation, Kičić became member of the drama ensemble in Atelje 212, one of the leading theatres in Eastern Europe In 2016, the theater celebrated its 60-years anniversary. where he has appeared in over forty plays. His notable theatre credits in Atelje 212 include Don Juan, Revizor, Amadeus and Spamalot. In 2010, he starred in the theatre's production of Hair, starring alongside Sergej Trifunović, Branislav Trifunović, Ivan Jevtović, Jelena Gavrilović and Katarina Žutić. For his leading role as Berger, Kičić won the Zoran Radmilović Award for his performance in the cult theatre's production of Hair.
 
He has also prominently worked in productions of JDP including Smrt, Samo sivi dani, Coriolanus and Vazda, the latter being a duodrama with Radovan Vujović.

Film and television

He made his film debut in 1996 as Erceg in the film Do koske. His leading roles in  War Live, Mala noćna muzika, Kad porastem biću Kengur, Seven and a Half and Redemption Street are credited with raising Kičić to prominence.

He starred in both film and television series of the innovative format cult classic Lavirint, as Laki. The role garnered him an Apollo Award at the Belgrade Culture Festival nomination.

Opposite Mirjana Karanović and Miloš Samolov, Kičić starred in 2009's Čekaj me, ja sigurno neću doći as the troubled and vulnerable Alek. His role won him the Emperor Constantine Award for Best Actor in a Supporting Role. That same year, in the film Posljednja audicijencija Kičić portrayed a young version of notable diplomat and politician Nikola Pašić.

He achieved a leading role in the Jagodići franchise, as Branko Jagodić. He appeared as the role in the television and three films.

In 2019, he starred in the box-office hit Četiri ruže as Žile, appeared in the Sergej Trifunović film Ajvar and made his directorial debut in Realna priča, in which he also starred in.

Radio and animation
Kičić also worked extensively for radio, recording radio dramas. Among his voice acting credits, Kičić is the official Serbian-language voice dub of Garfield, voicing the character in the television series Garfield and Friends and the films Garfield and Garfield 2. He voices Sheriff Woody in the Serbian Toy Story franchise. He also voiced Michelangelo in the Serbian version of the 2007 Teenage Mutant Ninja Turtles film.

Personal life 
Kičić was elected on 5-year term as a member of the Assembly of the Crvena zvezda Basketball Club on 27 December 2021.

Filmography

Film

Television

Voice-over roles

References

External links

 
 Interview at politika.rs 
 
 

1977 births
Living people
Male actors from Belgrade
Serbian male television actors
Serbian male film actors
Serbian male stage actors
Serbian male voice actors
Serbian theatre directors
Serbian television directors
Serbian film directors
Zoran Radmilović Award winners
Theatre people from Belgrade
Members of the Assembly of KK Crvena zvezda